This is a complete list of operas by the French Baroque composer Jean-Philippe Rameau (1683–1764).

{|class="wikitable sortable"
!|RCT!!|Title!!|Genre!!|Subdivisions!!|Libretto!!|Première date!!|Place, theatre
|-
|43||Hippolyte et Aricie||tragédie en musique||prologue and 5 acts||Abbé Simon-Joseph Pellegrin||1 October 1733, revised version: 11 September 1742||Paris, Opéra,  (both occasions)
|-
|56||Samson||||prologue and 5 acts||Voltaire||unperformed, lost, rehearsed 1734|| 
|-
|44||Les Indes galantes||opéra-ballet||prologue and 4 entrées (Le Turc généreux, Les Incas du Pérou, Les fleurs, Les sauvages) (originally just the first two)||Louis Fuzelier||23 August 1735, revised version: 10 March 1736||Paris, Opéra,  (both occasions)
|-
|32||Castor et Pollux||tragédie en musique||prologue and 5 acts||Pierre-Joseph-Justin Bernard||24 October 1737||Paris, Opéra, 
|-
|41||Les fêtes d'Hébé, ou Les talents lyriques||opéra-ballet||prologue and 3 entrées (La poésie, La musique, La danse)||Antoine Gautier de Montdorge||21 May 1739||Paris, Opéra, 
|-
|35||Dardanus||tragédie en musique||prologue and 5 acts||Charles-Antoine Le Clerc de La Bruère||||Paris, Opéra, 
|-
|54||La princesse de Navarre||comédie-ballet||3 acts||Voltaire||23 February 1745||Versailles, Théâtre du château
|-
|53||Platée or Junon jalouse||comédie lyrique||prologue and 3 acts||Jacques Autreau, revised by Adrien-Joseph Le Valois d'Orville||31 March 1745||Versailles, Théâtre du château
|-
|39||Les fêtes de Polymnie||opéra-ballet||prologue (Le temple de Mémoire) and 3 entrées (La fable, L'histoire, La féérie)||Louis de Cahusac||12 October 1745||Paris, Opéra, 
|-
|59||Le temple de la gloire||opéra-ballet||5 acts (originally), prologue and 3 acts (Bélus et Erigone, Bacchus, Trajan)||Voltaire||27 November 1745, revised version: 19 April 1746||Versailles, Théâtre du château; revised version: Paris, Opéra, 
|-
|40||Les fêtes de Ramire; reworking of: La princesse de Navarre||acte de ballet||1 act||Voltaire||22 December 1745||Versailles, Théâtre du château
|-
|38||Les fêtes de l'Hymen et de l'Amour, ou Les dieux d'Égypte||opéra-ballet||prologue and 3 entrées (Osiris, Canope, Aruéris ou Les Isies)||Louis de Cahusac||15 March 1747||Paris, Opéra, 
|-
|60||Zaïs||pastorale héroïque||prologue and 4 acts||Louis de Cahusac||29 February 1748||Paris, Opéra, 
|-
|52||Pigmalion||acte de ballet||1 act||Ballot de Sauvot, after Antoine Houdar de la Motte's Le triomphe des arts||27 August 1748||Paris, Opéra, 
|-
|58||Les surprises de l'Amour||opéra-ballet||prologue (Le retour d'Astrée) and 2 entrées (La lyre enchantée, Adonis, or, in the 1757 revision, L'enlévement d'Adonis)||Pierre-Joseph-Justin Bernard||27 November 1748, revised 31 May 1757 and 10 October 1758||Versailles (1748), Paris, Opéra,  (1757, 1758)
|-
|49||Naïs||pastorale héroïque||prologue and 3 acts||Louis de Cahusac||22 April 1749||Paris, Opéra, 
|-
|62||Zoroastre||tragédie en musique||5 acts||Louis de Cahusac||5 December 1749||Paris, Opéra, 
|-
|29||Acante et Céphise, ou La sympathie||pastorale héroïque||3 acts||Jean-François Marmontel||18 November 1751||Paris, Opéra, 
|-
|46||Linus||tragédie en musique||5 acts||Charles-Antoine Leclerc de La Bruère||in rehearsal ca. 1752 but unperformed, lost||
|-
|42||La guirlande, ou Les fleurs enchantées||acte de ballet||1 act||Jean-François Marmontel||21 September 1751||Paris, Opéra, 
|-
|34||Daphnis et Eglé||pastorale héroïque||1 act||Charles Collé||30 October 1753||Fontainebleau, Théâtre du château
|-
|47||Lisis et Délie||pastorale||1 act||Jean-François Marmontel||scheduled for 6 November 1753 but not performed, lost||
|-
|57||Les Sibarites (original title: Sibaris)||acte de ballet||1 act||Jean-François Marmontel||13 November 1753||Fontainebleau, Théâtre du château
|-
|48||La naissance d'Osiris, ou La fête Pamilie||acte de ballet||1 act||Louis de Cahusac||12 October 1754||Fontainebleau, Théâtre du château
|-
|30||Anacréon (1754)||acte de ballet||1 act||Louis de Cahusac||23 October 1754||Fontainebleau, Théâtre du château
|-
|58||Anacréon (1757)||acte de ballet||1 act (a completely different work from the above, it was given as the 3rd entrée of a revised version of Les surprises de l'Amour)||Pierre-Joseph-Justin Bernard||31 May 1757||Paris, Opéra, 
|-
|51||Les Paladins||comédie lyrique||3 acts||Jean-François Duplat de Monticourt, after Jean de La Fontaine's Le petit chien qui secoue l'argent et des perrieres and Ludovico Ariosto's Orlando furioso||12 February 1760||Paris, Opéra, 
|-
|31||Les Boréades (Abaris)||tragédie en musique||5 acts||Louis de Cahusac||unperformed, in rehearsal 1763|| 
|-
|50||Nélée et Myrthis or Les beaux jours de l'amour||acte de ballet||1 act|| ||unperformed|| 
|-
|61||Zéphire or Les nymphes de Diane||acte de ballet||1 act|| ||unperformed|| 
|-
|45||Io||acte de ballet||1 act, incomplete|| ||unperformed, unfinished|| 
|}

References
Notes

Sources
Sadler, Graham (1992), "Rameau, Jean-Philippe" in The New Grove Dictionary of Opera'', ed. Stanley Sadie (London) 
Some of the information in this article is taken from the Dutch Wikipedia article.

 
Lists of operas by composer
Lists of compositions by composer